Leptura hovorei is a species of beetle in the family Cerambycidae. It was described by Linsley and Chemsak in 1976.

References

Lepturinae
Beetles described in 1976